The 1988 City of Aberdeen Council election took place on 5 May 1988 to elect members of City of Aberdeen Council, as part of that years Scottish local elections.

Election results

Ward results

References

1988
1988 Scottish local elections
20th century in Aberdeen